Montbron is a commune in the Charente department in southwestern France on the Tardoire river.

François Victor Alphonse Aulard (1849–1928) was born in Montbron. He was the first professional French historian of the French Revolution and of Napoleon.

Population

See also
Communes of the Charente department

References

Communes of Charente
Angoumois